Sensual is the second studio album by Puerto Rican singer Tito Rojas, released in 1990 by Musical Productions. From this album songs such as Ella Se Hizo Deseo, Sensual and Siempre Sere stand out. It is currently considered one of the most notable musical comebacks in salsa history, after stalling his career on the album of the same name Tito Rojas in 1981. His hit Siempre Seré ranked number 35 in tropical songs on the Billboard charts in 1990.

Background 
The album was made after the stagnation in the career as a solo singer in 1981. Previously participating in 1983 with the Fania All Stars with "El Campesino", also recording another solo album Solo Con Un Beso although it did not have the expected success.

Track listing 
This list has been adapted from AllMusic and Discogs.

Credits 
This list of credits has been adapted from AllMusic.

Charts

Weekly charts

Year-end charts

References

Salsa albums
1990 albums